John Neil "Bull" Brown was an American football and baseball player for the Vanderbilt Commodores of Vanderbilt University. He was said by coach Dan McGugin to be one of his six best players ever coached. He was selected All-Southern in 1928 and 1929, and All-American in 1929. One of his best games came tackling Minnesota running back Bronko Nagurski. He ran 85 yards for a touchdown on 1928 national champion Georgia Tech.

See also
1929 College Football All-America Team

References

Vanderbilt Commodores baseball players
Vanderbilt Commodores football players
American football guards
All-American college football players
All-Southern college football players
Baseball outfielders